Hot Cross Bunny is a 1948 Warner Bros. Merrie Melodies theatrical animated short. The short was released on August 21, 1948, and features Bugs Bunny. The title is a play on the nursery rhyme Hot Cross Buns as well as a punny allusion to the basic plot premise.

Plot
Bugs is "Experimental Rabbit #46" in the Eureka Hospital Experimental Laboratory, Paul Revere Foundation (which sports the unencouraging slogan 'Hardly a man is now alive' in punning allusion to Henry Wadsworth Longfellow's "Paul Revere's Ride"). Bugs lives a pampered life, oblivious to the fact that a scientist plans on switching his brain (or at least his personality, since no surgery is involved) with that of a chicken.

After giving Bugs an examination (including a joke when Bugs reads the microscopic "Allied Trades Council" union disclaimer on an eye chart when told to read the bottom line), the scientist brings him out to the operating theater, in front of an audience of fellow doctors.  Bugs thinks he's been brought out to perform. He pulls out all the stops, including his impression of Lionel Barrymore ("I'm the mayor of the Town!"), a magic act and dancing. Upon finishing each act, he looks around to see the unimpressed, stern-faced doctors in exactly the same frame position each time ("What a tough audience! It ain't like St. Joe!"). The scientist attempts to retrieve Bugs, but is pushed away. He strikes Bugs with a hammer while the rabbit is in the middle of a Danny Kaye-esque scat routine, but Bugs quickly revives and, having failed as the entertainment, becomes a vendor instead, selling hot dogs to the scientists, only to be hammered again. Learning the scientist's intentions, Bugs runs and a chase ensues.

Bugs hides in a closet, not noticing a skeleton in there, and comes out scared when he does see it. Then, when chased into the laboratory, he makes an ostensibly explosive cocktail and threatens the scientist with it, saying: "One more step and I'll blow ya up! This contains manganese, phosphorus, nitrate, lactic acid, and dextrose!" The scientist laughingly dismisses the threat, telling Bugs the aforementioned ingredients are the formula for a chocolate malt and Bugs drinks it, saying: "Yum, yum! I'm a better scientist than I thought." Then Bugs hides near an oxygen tent disguised as a Boy Scout, leading the scientist in the wrong direction and Bugs sits up and salutes: "That was me good deed for the day!".

Finally, Bugs is rendered helpless with laughing gas and placed on the table, with metallic mind-switching caps placed on him and the rather uninterested-looking chicken.  At the last minute, he switches the electrodes (though it is revealed at the end that Bugs cut the wire connecting to his electrode instead) and the scientist ends up clucking like a chicken, while the chicken (with the scientist's mind) states in plain English he hopes that the experiment can be reversed. Bugs tells the audience: "Looks like Doc is a victim of fowl play" and laughs.

Home media
 VHS/DVD: Stars of Space Jam: Bugs Bunny (Unrestored)
 DVD/Blu-Ray: Treasure of the Sierra Madre (Unrestored, as a bonus feature)
 Blu-Ray: Bugs Bunny 80th Anniversary Collection (Restored, with the original opening and ending titles)
 Streaming: HBO Max (Restored, with the original opening and ending titles)

References

External links 

 

1948 films
1948 short films
1948 animated films
Merrie Melodies short films
Films directed by Robert McKimson
Mad scientist films
Films scored by Carl Stalling
Bugs Bunny films
1940s Warner Bros. animated short films
Films about brain transplants